San Carlo is a village in Tuscany, central Italy, administratively a frazione of the comune of San Vincenzo, province of Livorno. At the time of the 2011 census its population was 256.

The village is about 62 km from Livorno and 5 km from San Vincenzo.

External links 
 

Frazioni of the Province of Livorno